Hypolycaena sipylus is a butterfly of the family Lycaenidae. It is widespread in Indonesia as well as occurring in the Philippines and the New Guinea region. It is the type species of the genus Hypolycaena.

Subspecies
H. s. sipylus (Moluccas)
H. s. tharrytas C. & R. Felder, 1862 (Philippines)
H. s. giscon Fruhstorfer, 1912 (northern Sulawesi, Sula islands)
H. s. rhodanus Fruhstorfer (southern Sulawesi)
H. s. numa Fruhstorfer, 1912 (Wetar Island, south-western Maluku, Lesser Sunda chain)
H. s. capella Fruhstorfer (Lombok)

Gallery

References

Butterflies described in 1860
Hypolycaenini
Butterflies of Indonesia
Butterflies of Oceania